Kamolidin Nazhimidinovich Tashiyev (born 9 February 2000) is a Kyrgyzstani footballer who currently plays for Abdysh-Ata Kant.

Career statistics

Club

References

2000 births
Living people
Kyrgyzstani footballers
Kyrgyzstani expatriate footballers
Association football defenders
Singapore Premier League players
Geylang International FC players
Kyrgyzstani expatriate sportspeople in Singapore
Expatriate footballers in Singapore